Coon Creek is a stream in Pettis County in the U.S. state of Missouri. It is a tributary to Muddy Creek.

Coon Creek was so named due to the presence of raccoons in the area.

See also
List of rivers of Missouri

References

Rivers of Pettis County, Missouri
Rivers of Missouri